Sonchus tenerrimus is a species of flowering plant in the family Asteraceae known by the common name slender sowthistle. It is native to the Mediterranean region of southern Europe, northern Africa, and the Middle East. It has been found as well in several other locations around the world, historically in association with ship ballast in coastal regions. It has become naturalized in a few places, such as California in the United States and Baja California in Mexico.

Sonchus tenerrimus is an annual or perennial herb producing a slender, branching stem up to about 80 centimeters (32 inches) tall. The leaves are deeply divided into many variously shaped lobes which may have toothed edges or smaller lobes. The inflorescence bears flower heads lined with glandular, hairy to woolly phyllaries. They are filled with numerous yellow ray florets but no disc florets. The fruit is an achene up to a centimeter long including its pappus.

References

External links
Jepson Manual Treatment, University of California
University of California, Calphotos Photos gallery
Tropicos.org: photo of herbarium specimen collected in Nuevo León in northeastern Mexico in 1992

tenerrimus
Plants described in 1753
Taxa named by Carl Linnaeus
Flora of Malta